Alberto Cavasin (born 9 January 1956) is an Italian football manager and former player.

Playing career
Cavasin, a right back, started his professional career in 1973 for Treviso; he then played for a number of Serie A, B and C clubs, with some success. He retired in 1990.

Managerial career
After a few months as Allievi Nazionali coach for Calcio Padova, Cavasin became coach of Treviso for the 1990–91 season, to be sacked soon after. After a number of season at the helm of several Serie C clubs, Cavasin became coach of last-placed Serie B club A.C. Cesena in 1998, as a replacement for Corrado Benedetti, and led the team to keep its place in the league. In 1999, he became coach of U.S. Lecce of Serie A, and led the club to two good seasons, before to be fired in early 2002. He then coached Serie C2 club Florentia Viola (then Fiorentina) in 2002, as replacement for Pietro Vierchowod, to be sacked in 2004. Successively he also coached minor Serie A teams such as Brescia and Treviso with little success.

He became coach of Messina on 30 January 2007, as replacement for Bruno Giordano; he was however sacked about two months later, on 2 April, following a 2–0 defeat to Cagliari. On 22 June 2007, he was announced as the new Frosinone boss, leading them to a mid-table finish in the club's second Serie B campaign. On 5 June 2008, Frosinone announced it had parted company with Alberto Cavasin.

On 20 May 2009, he completed a comeback at Brescia, replacing Nedo Sonetti as head coach for the remaining two games of the 2008–09 Serie B regular season, with the aim to lead the rondinelle into the promotion playoffs. After being sacked by Brescia, on 12 November 2009 he became the manager of AC Bellinzona, a Swiss Super League team. On 2 April 2010, Bellinzona fired the Italian trainer, formerly he coaching Lecce, Fiorentina and Brescia.

On 7 March 2011, he was named head coach of UC Sampdoria, replacing Domenico Di Carlo for the remainder of the 2010–11 Serie A and was ultimately relegated to Serie B with the team. In October 2016 he took over at the Football League Two side Leyton Orient. He was dismissed from his role on 23 November 2016 after ten games in charge with a record of two wins and eight defeats.

He returned to work in Italy in December 2017, as head coach of Serie C club Santarcangelo. He was however dismissed in March 2018 due to poor results.

After three years of inactivity, in August 2021 Cavasin accepted to become the new head coach of Barisardo, a small Sardinian club playing in the Prima Categoria regional amateur league (seventh level of Italian football). He left Barisardo after one season, where he guided the small Sardinian club to win the league.

Honours

Coach
Individual
 Panchina d'Oro: 1999–2000

References

External links
 Alberto Cavasin official website 

Living people
1956 births
Sportspeople from Treviso
Italian footballers
Association football defenders
Treviso F.B.C. 1993 players
U.S. Avellino 1912 players
Atalanta B.C. players
S.P.A.L. players
Hellas Verona F.C. players
U.S. Catanzaro 1929 players
S.S.C. Bari players
A.C. Cesena players
Calcio Padova players
Serie A players
Serie B players
Italian football managers
Treviso F.B.C. 1993 managers
A.C. Cesena managers
U.S. Lecce managers
ACF Fiorentina managers
Brescia Calcio managers
A.C.R. Messina managers
Frosinone Calcio managers
AC Bellinzona managers
U.C. Sampdoria managers
Serie A managers
Leyton Orient F.C. managers
English Football League managers
Italian expatriate football managers
Italian expatriate sportspeople in England
Footballers from Veneto